Daniel Chávez (born 20 January 1946) is a Mexican rower. He competed in the men's coxed four event at the 1968 Summer Olympics.

References

1946 births
Living people
Mexican male rowers
Olympic rowers of Mexico
Rowers at the 1968 Summer Olympics
Sportspeople from Jalisco